Earl Hamilton Richard Eastwood (November 2, 1905 – July 4, 1968) was a Canadian rower who competed in the 1932 Summer Olympics.

He was born in Hamilton, Ontario.

In 1932 he was a crew member of the Canadian boat which won the bronze medal in the eights event.

At the 1930 Empire Games he won the bronze medal with the Canadian boat in the eights competition.

External links
Earl Eastwood's profile at Sports Reference.com

1905 births
1968 deaths
Rowers from Hamilton, Ontario
Canadian male rowers
Olympic rowers of Canada
Rowers at the 1932 Summer Olympics
Olympic bronze medalists for Canada
Rowers at the 1930 British Empire Games
Commonwealth Games bronze medallists for Canada
Olympic medalists in rowing
Medalists at the 1932 Summer Olympics
Commonwealth Games medallists in rowing
20th-century Canadian people
Medallists at the 1930 British Empire Games